Faces is a 1934 British drama film directed by Sidney Morgan and starring Anna Lee, Harold French and Walter Sondes.

Cast
 Anna Lee as Madeleine Pelham  
 Harold French as Ted  
 Walter Sondes as Dick Morris  
 Moore Marriott as Robert Pelham  
 Kate Saxon as Mrs. Pelham  
 Beryl de Querton as Amy Amor  
 Noel Shannon as Alphonse  
 Olive Sloane as Lady Wallingford

References

Bibliography
 Low, Rachael. Filmmaking in 1930s Britain. George Allen & Unwin, 1985.
 Wood, Linda. British Films, 1927-1939. British Film Institute, 1986.

External links

1934 films
British drama films
1934 drama films
Films directed by Sidney Morgan
British black-and-white films
British and Dominions Studios films
Films shot at Imperial Studios, Elstree
1930s English-language films
1930s British films